The following are the football (soccer) events of the year 1971 throughout the world.

Events
January 2 – Second Ibrox disaster. Barriers on Stairway 13 at Ibrox Park give way under a crush of fans departing a Rangers–Celtic match, killing 66 and injuring over 200.

17 April 1971 - France and the Netherlands played the first women's international football match recognized by FIFA against the France. The match took place in Hazebrouck, France and resulted in a 4–0 defeat for the Netherlands with Jocelyne Ratignier scoring a hattrick and Marie-Claire Caron-Harant scoring once. 

Copa Libertadores:Won by Nacional after defeating Estudiantes La Plata on an aggregate score of 2–0.
May 20 – Ajax claims the KNVB Cup by defeating Sparta Rotterdam in the second leg, 2–1.
9 May – The very first Women's FA Cup in England, the Mitre Challenge Trophy for women's professional soccer football, was won when Southampton Women's F.C. defeated Stewarton Thistle, 4 to 1, in the final held at Crystal Palace National Sports Centre.  Pat Davies scored three of her team's four goals and Dot Cassell contributed the lone Stewarton score.

Winners club national championship

Asia
 : Taj
 : Al-Oruba

Europe
 : Olympique de Marseille
 : Inter Milan
 : Feyenoord
 : Valencia
 : Galatasaray

North America
: Club América
 / : 
 Dallas Tornado (NASL)

South America

 : Atlético Mineiro

International tournaments
1971 British Home Championship (May 15 – May 22, 1971)

 Pan American Games in Colombia (July 31 – August 12, 1971)
 Gold Medal: 
 Silver Medal: 
 Bronze Medal:

Births

January
 January 1 – Juan Carlos Plata, Guatemalan footballer and coach
 January 2 – Slobodan Komljenović, Serbian footballer
 January 5 – Bjørn Otto Bragstad, Norwegian footballer
 January 8 – Jesper Jansson, Swedish footballer
 January 10 – Rudi Istenič, Slovenian footballer
 January 14 – Bert Konterman, Dutch footballer
 January 14 – Antonis Nikopolidis, Greek goalkeeper
 January 16 – Ulrich van Gobbel, Dutch footballer
 January 18 – Pep Guardiola, Spanish footballer
 January 26 – Giuseppe Pancaro, Italian footballer
 January 29 – Jörg Albertz, German footballer

February
 February 1 – Joaquín Hernández, Mexican footballer
 February 1 – Zlatko Zahovič, Slovenian footballer
 February 1 – Marcelinho Carioca, Brazilian footballer
 February 2 – Osvaldo Peralta, Paraguayan footballer
 February 4 – Maarten Atmodikoro, Dutch footballer
 February 17 – Carlos Gamarra, Paraguayan footballer
 February 20 – Jari Litmanen, Finnish footballer

March
 March 4 – Jovan Stanković, Serbian footballer
 March 13 – Allan Nielsen, Danish footballer
 March 15 – Joachim Björklund, Swedish footballer
 March 18 – Jerzy Brzęczek, Polish footballer
 March 18 – Fernando Ochoaizpur, Bolivian footballer
 March 26 – Liviu Ciobotariu, Romanian footballer

April
 April 2 – Francisco Arce, Paraguayan international
 April 2 – Edmundo Alves de Souza Neto, Brazilian footballer
 April 5 – Choi Eun-sung, South Korean club player
 April 7 – Franky Vandendriessche, Belgian goalkeeper
 April 8 – Kim Byung-ji, South Korean international goalkeeper
 April 9 – Víctor López, Uruguayan footballer
 April 13 – Steven Lustü, Danish footballer and coach
 April 14 – Miguel Calero, Colombian international (d. 2012)
 April 15 – Finidi George, Nigerian footballer
 April 17 – José Francisco Cevallos, Ecuadorian footballer, Minister of Sports in Ecuador and President of Barcelona F.C.
 April 23 – Hjalmar Zambrano, Ecuadorian footballer

May
 May 14 – Martin Reim, Estonian footballer

June
 June 3 – Luigi Di Biagio, Italian footballer
 June 5 – Francisco Gabriel de Anda, Mexican footballer and analyst
 June 9 
Gilles De Bilde, Belgian footballer
Uladzimir Zhuravel, Belarusian footballer and coach (d. 2018)
 June 14 – Håkan Mild, Swedish footballer
 June 23 – Enrique Romero, Spanish footballer
 June 24 – Thomas Helveg, Danish international
 June 25 – Neil Lennon, Northern Irish footballer and manager
 June 28 – Fabien Barthez, French footballer

July
 July 26 – Mladen Rudonja, Slovenian footballer
 July 31 – Elivélton, Brazilian international footballer
 July 31 – Ignacio Vázquez, Mexican footballer

August
 August 10 – Roy Keane, Irish footballer and manager
 August 16 – Rick Slor, Dutch footballer
 August 18 – Patrik Andersson, Swedish footballer
 August 19 – Miguel Ponce, Chilean footballer
 August 23 – Demetrio Albertini, Italian footballer
 August 26 – Osman Özköylü, Turkish footballer
 August 27 – Ernest Faber, Dutch footballer
 August 29 – Marco Sandy, Bolivian footballer

September
 September 1 – Hakan Şükür, Turkish footballer
 September 3 – Ángel Lemus, Mexican footballer
 September 3 – Paolo Montero, Uruguayan footballer
 September 9 – Mikel Lasa, Spanish footballer
 September 9 – Johan Mjällby, Swedish footballer
 September 13 – Mladen Dabanovič, Slovenian footballer
 September 17 – Edílson, Brazilian footballer
 September 18 – Filip Apelstav, Swedish footballer
 September 20 – Henrik Larsson, Swedish footballer and manager
 September 29 – Miguel Fuentes, Mexican footballer
 September 29 – Jeffrey Talan, Dutch footballer

October
 October 4 – Jorge Costa, Portuguese footballer
 October 5 – Bertrand Crasson, Belgian footballer
 October 7 – Ismael Urzaiz, Spanish footballer
 October 8 – Miran Pavlin, Slovenian footballer
 October 13 – André Bergdølmo, Norwegian footballer
 October 15 – Andy Cole, English footballer
 October 15 – Niko Kovač, Croatian footballer
 October 16 – Geert De Vlieger, Belgian footballer
 October 18 – Yoo Sang-chul, South Korean footballer
 October 21 – René Ponk, Dutch footballer
 October 25 – Geoffrey Prommayon, Dutch footballer
 October 26 – Didier Martel, French footballer
 October 27 – Theodoros Zagorakis, Greek footballer

November
November 3 – Dwight Yorke, Trinidadian and Tobagonian footballer
November 13 – Unai Emery, Spanish footballer and manager  
November 13 – Erwin Ramírez, Ecuadorian footballer
November 16 – Mustapha Hadji, Moroccan footballer
November 30 – Pedro Pineda, Mexican footballer

December
 December 2 – Francesco Toldo, Italian footballer
 December 3 – Henk Timmer, Dutch footballer
 December 7 – Spira Grujić, Serbian footballer
 December 8 – Abdullah Ercan, Turkish footballer
 December 14 – Arsenio Benítez, Paraguayan footballer
 December 26 – Mika Nurmela, Finnish footballer
 December 28 – Sergi Barjuán, Spanish footballer
 December 29 – Niclas Alexandersson, Swedish footballer

Deaths

 June 30 – Georgi Asparuhov (28), Bulgarian footballer (born 1943)
 June 30 – Nikola Kotkov (32), Bulgarian footballer (born 1938)
 July 13 – Harry Dénis (74), Dutch footballer (born 1896)
 August 5 – Ber Groosjohan (74), Dutch footballer (born 1897)

References

 
Association football by year